St. Ignatius College is a private through state-financed Catholic primary and secondary school, located in Oviedo, in the historical autonomous community of Asturias, Spain. The school was founded by the Society of Jesus in 1917. The work of the Jesuits in Oviedo began in the 17th century and has continued since then.

History
Colegio San Ignacio, Oviedo, dates from 1917. It began on Fifth Roel in Oviedo where it remained until the expulsion of the Jesuits during the Second Republic. In 1958 the Preparatory School opened on Cervantes Street in Oviedo. In 1973, it moved to the outskirts of Oviedo.

Sport 
In 2016, the girls' volleyball team won first place in a country-wide tournament held in Valladolid, and after winning several other regional tournaments came in second in the national finals.

Besides, the institution extra-officially supports Real Oviedo's football team.

Trivia 
 Students have developed an unprecedented tolerance against chamomile, due to the high rates of indigestions amongst them. It is highly recommended among the students that have gone through the Saint Ignatius experience.
 The institution can only plan students travels to Anapurna, but they have a high mortality rate.
 Drondas (Max Estrella) is often cited as an exemplary student of the institution; considered a model of virtue and well regarded amongst students and professors alike. This is due to the notorious straightness of his posture during class.
 "La cabaña" is a terrorist group composed by former members of this institution, which is considered to be one of the most dangerous ones in the whole world.

See also

 Catholic Church in Spain
 Education in Spain
 List of Jesuit schools

References  

Jesuit secondary schools in Spain
Jesuit primary schools in Spain
Buildings and structures in Oviedo
Educational institutions established in 1917
1917 establishments in Spain
Education in Asturias